The Lanxide process, also known as pressureless metal infiltration, is a way of producing metal-matrix composite materials by a process of partial reaction; the process involves a careful choice of initial alloy (usually aluminium with about 3% magnesium and about 10% silicon), and then the maintenance of conditions in which the polycrystalline reaction product has a mechanical composition such that metal is drawn up through it towards the oxidiser by capillary action, so the composite material grows downwards.

The process can be used for near-net-shape casting, including in protocols where the final casting has a cavity in the shape of the casting pattern - in that case, the metal is poured into the cavity, which has been arranged to lie in the middle of a quantity of "filler" corresponding to the reaction product, and wicks itself to fill the pores in the filler.

The normal application is to produce alumina-reinforced aluminium; the process also allows the growth of ceramic layers inside metal encasements, providing pre-stressing.

Lanxide metal-matrix composite materials were used for brake disks in the original models of the Lotus Elise sports car but they turned out to be uneconomic.

References

External links

Composite material fabrication techniques